Otitoma vitrea is a species of sea snail, a marine gastropod mollusk in the family Pseudomelatomidae, the turrids and allies.

Description
The length of the shell attains 5.5 mm.

The cylindrically elongated shell is thin, pellucid, glassy and smooth. It shows no longitudinal ribs. There are a few revolving grooves at the upper and lower part of the body whorl, the former appearing on the spire also. The color of the shell is yellowish white.

Distribution
This marine species occurs off Singapore and the Philippines.

References

External links
  Tucker, J.K. 2004 Catalog of recent and fossil turrids (Mollusca: Gastropoda). Zootaxa 682:1–1295
 Kilburn R.N. (2004) The identities of Otitoma and Antimitra (Mollusca: Gastropoda: Conidae and Buccinidae). African Invertebrates, 45: 263–270
 Gastropods.com: Otitoma vitrea

vitrea
Gastropods described in 1845